The 2022–23 Milwaukee Bucks season is the 55th season for the franchise in the National Basketball Association (NBA). On August 17, 2022, the NBA announced that the regular season for the league would begin October 18, 2022 and end on April 9, 2023.

Draft 

The Bucks own their first-round pick. They initially had a second round pick, but it was forfeited due to tampering violations with respect to free agency in 2021.

Roster

Standings

Division

Conference

Game log

Preseason 

|-style="background:#fcc;"
| 1
| October 1
| Memphis
| 
| Jordan Nwora (21)
| Jordan Nwora (8)
| Jevon Carter (4)
| Fiserv Forum13,023
| 0–1
|- style="background:#fcc;"
| 2
| October 6
| @ Atlanta
| 
| Giannis Antetokounmpo (19)
| G. Antetokounmpo, Ibaka, Portis (7)
| Jrue Holiday (7)
| Etihad Arena11,449
| 0–2
|- style="background:#fcc;"
| 3
| October 8
| Atlanta
| 
| Lindell Wigginton (16)
| Ibaka, Portis (5)
| Carter, Holiday, Mamukelashvili (4)
| Etihad Arena11,563
| 0–3
|- style="background:#fcc;"
| 4
| October 11
| @ Chicago
| 
| Jordan Nwora (25)
| Sandro Mamukelashvili (9)
| Lindell Wigginton (5)
| United Center19,356
| 0–4
|- style="background:#fcc;
| 5
| October 12
| Brooklyn
| 
| Giannis Antetokounmpo (24)
| Giannis Antetokounmpo (14)
| G. Antetokounmpo, Holiday, Carter, Nwora (4)
| Fiserv Forum12,544
| 0–5

Regular season

|-style="background:#cfc;"
| 1
| October 20
| @ Philadelphia
| 
| Giannis Antetokounmpo (21)
| Giannis Antetokounmpo (13)
| G. Antetokounmpo, Holiday (8) 
| Wells Fargo Center20,060
| 1–0
|-style="background:#cfc;"
| 2
| October 22
| Houston
| 
| Giannis Antetokounmpo (44)
| Giannis Antetokounmpo (12)
| Jrue Holiday (10) 
| Fiserv Forum17,341
| 2–0
|-style="background:#cfc;"
| 3
| October 26
| Brooklyn
| 
| Giannis Antetokounmpo (43)
| Giannis Antetokounmpo (14)
| Giannis Antetokounmpo (5)
| Fiserv Forum17,341
| 3–0
|-style="background:#cfc;"
| 4
| October 28
| New York
| 
| Giannis Antetokounmpo (30)
| Giannis Antetokounmpo (14)
| Giannis Antetokounmpo (9)
| Fiserv Forum17,341
| 4–0
|-style="background:#cfc;"
| 5
| October 29
| Atlanta
| 
| G. Antetokounmpo, Holiday (34)
| Giannis Antetokounmpo (17)
| Jrue Holiday (11)
| Fiserv Forum17,341
| 5–0
|-style="background:#cfc;"
| 6
| October 31
| Detroit
| 
| Giannis Antetokounmpo (31)
| Bobby Portis (12)
| Jrue Holiday (10)
| Fiserv Forum17,341
| 6–0

|-style="background:#cfc;"
| 7
| November 2
| Detroit
| 
| Giannis Antetokounmpo (32)
| Giannis Antetokounmpo (12)
| G. Antetokounmpo, Allen (4)
| Fiserv Forum17,341
| 7–0
|-style="background:#cfc;"
| 8
| November 4
| @ Minnesota
| 
| Jrue Holiday (29)
| Giannis Antetokounmpo (13)
| Giannis Antetokounmpo (11)
| Target Center17,136
| 8–0
|-style="background:#cfc;"
| 9
| November 5
| Oklahoma City
| 
| Brook Lopez (25)
| Bobby Portis (21)
| Jrue Holiday (13)
| Fiserv Forum17,713
| 9–0
|-style="background:#fcc;"
| 10
| November 7
| @ Atlanta
| 
| Giannis Antetokounmpo (25)
| Bobby Portis (10)
| Jrue Holiday (7)
| State Farm Arena17,494
| 9–1
|-style="background:#cfc;"
| 11
| November 9
| @ Oklahoma City
| 
| Jevon Carter (36)
| Brook Lopez (13)
| Jevon Carter (12)
| Paycom Center15,180
| 10–1
|-style="background:#fcc;"
| 12
| November 11
| @ San Antonio
| 
| Jevon Carter (21)
| Bobby Portis (12)
| Jevon Carter (6)
| AT&T Center15,642
| 10–2
|-style="background:#fcc;"
| 13
| November 14
| Atlanta
| 
| Giannis Antetokounmpo (27)
| Bobby Portis (10)
| Jevon Carter (6)
| Fiserv Forum17,341
| 10–3
|-style="background:#cfc;"
| 14
| November 16
| Cleveland
| 
| Brook Lopez (29)
| Giannis Antetokounmpo (12)
| G. Antetokounmpo, Carter (8)
| Fiserv Forum17,341
| 11–3
|-style="background:#fcc;"
| 15
| November 18
| @ Philadelphia
| 
| Giannis Antetokounmpo (25)
| Giannis Antetokounmpo (14)
| G. Antetokounmpo, Holiday (4)
| Wells Fargo Center19,769
| 11–4
|-style="background:#cfc;"
| 16
| November 21
| Portland
| 
| Giannis Antetokounmpo (37)
| Grayson Allen (8)
| G. Antetokounmpo, Holiday (6)
| Fiserv Forum17,341
| 12–4
|-style="background:#fcc;"
| 17
| November 23
| Chicago
| 
| Giannis Antetokounmpo (36)
| Bobby Portis (12)
| Jrue Holiday (11)
| Fiserv Forum17,341
| 12–5
|-style="background:#cfc;"
| 18
| November 25
| Cleveland
| 
| Giannis Antetokounmpo (38)
| Giannis Antetokounmpo (9)
| Giannis Antetokounmpo (6)
| Fiserv Forum17,447
| 13–5
|-style="background:#cfc;"
| 19
| November 27
| Dallas
| 
| Giannis Antetokounmpo (30)
| Giannis Antetokounmpo (11)
| Carter, Holiday (6)
| Fiserv Forum17,341
| 14–5
|-style="background:#cfc;"
| 20
| November 30
| @ New York
| 
| Giannis Antetokounmpo (37)
| Giannis Antetokounmpo (13)
| Giannis Antetokounmpo (7)
| Madison Square Garden17,277
| 15–5

|-style="background:#fcc;"
| 21
| December 2
| L.A. Lakers
| 
| Giannis Antetokounmpo (40)
| Bobby Portis (10)
| Jrue Holiday (9)
| Fiserv Forum17,938
| 15–6
|-style="background:#cfc;"
| 22
| December 3
| @ Charlotte
| 
| Bobby Portis (20)
| Bobby Portis (8)
| Bobby Portis (7)
| Spectrum Center18,128
| 16–6
|-style="background:#cfc;"
| 23
| December 5
| @ Orlando
| 
| Giannis Antetokounmpo (34)
| Giannis Antetokounmpo (13)
| Jrue Holiday (10)
| Amway Center16,174
| 17–6
|-style="background:#cfc;"
| 24
| December 7
| Sacramento
| 
| Giannis Antetokounmpo (35)
| Brook Lopez (9)
| Giannis Antetokounmpo (7)
| Fiserv Forum17,341
| 18–6
|-style="background:#cfc;"
| 25
| December 9
| @ Dallas
| 
| Giannis Antetokounmpo (28)
| Giannis Antetokounmpo (10)
| Jrue Holiday (6)
| American Airlines Center20,277
| 19–6
|-style="background:#fcc;"
| 26
| December 11
| @ Houston
| 
| Jrue Holiday (25)
| Giannis Antetokounmpo (18)
| Jrue Holiday (8)
| Toyota Center16,268
| 19–7
|-style="background:#cfc;"
| 27
| December 13
| Golden State
| 
| Giannis Antetokounmpo (30)
| Giannis Antetokounmpo (12)
| Giannis Antetokounmpo (5)
| Fiserv Forum17,628
| 20–7
|-style="background:#fcc;"
| 28
| December 15
| @ Memphis
| 
| G. Antetokounmpo, Portis (19)
| Bobby Portis (7)
| G. Antetokounmpo, Middleton, Hill (5)
| FedExForum17,794
| 20–8
|-style="background:#cfc;"
| 29
| December 17
| Utah
| 
| Bobby Portis (22)
| Bobby Portis (14)
| Jrue Holiday (8)
| Fiserv Forum17,587
| 21–8
|-style="background:#cfc;"
| 30
| December 19
| @ New Orleans
| 
| Giannis Antetokounmpo (42)
| Giannis Antetokounmpo (10)
| Jrue Holiday (11)
| Smoothie King Center18,271
| 22–8
|-style="background:#fcc;"
| 31
| December 21
| @ Cleveland
| 
| Giannis Antetokounmpo (45)
| Giannis Antetokounmpo (14)
| Jrue Holiday (8)
| Rocket Mortgage FieldHouse19,432
| 22–9
|-style="background:#fcc;"
| 32
| December 23
| @ Brooklyn
| 
| Giannis Antetokounmpo (26)
| Giannis Antetokounmpo (13)
| Giannis Antetokounmpo (7)
| Barclays Center18,169
| 22–10
|-style="background:#fcc;"
| 33
| December 25
| @ Boston
| 
| Giannis Antetokounmpo (27)
| G. Antetokounmpo, Portis (9)
| Jrue Holiday (7)
| TD Garden19,156
| 22–11
|-style="background:#fcc;"
| 34
| December 28
| @ Chicago
| 
| Giannis Antetokounmpo (45)
| Giannis Antetokounmpo (22)
| Giannis Antetokounmpo (7)
| United Center21,537
| 22–12
|-style="background:#cfc;"
| 35
| December 30
| Minnesota
| 
| Giannis Antetokounmpo (43)
| Giannis Antetokounmpo (20)
| Joe Ingles (10)
| Fiserv Forum18,018
| 23–12

|-style="background:#fcc;"
| 36
| January 1
| Washington
| 
| Bobby Portis (19)
| Lopez, Portis (10)
| Grayson Allen (8)
| Fiserv Forum17,341
| 23–13
|-style="background:#cfc;"
| 37
| January 3
| Washington
| 
| Giannis Antetokounmpo (55)
| Bobby Portis (13)
| Giannis Antetokounmpo (7)
| Fiserv Forum17,341
| 24–13
|-style="background:#cfc;"
| 38
| January 4
| @ Toronto
| 
| Giannis Antetokounmpo (30)
| Giannis Antetokounmpo (21)
| Giannis Antetokounmpo (10)
| Scotiabank Arena19,800
| 25–13
|-style="background:#fcc;"
| 39
| January 6
| Charlotte
| 
| Bobby Portis (19)
| Bobby Portis (12)
| Jrue Holiday (4)
| Fiserv Forum17,341
| 25–14
|-style="background:#cfc;"
| 40
| January 9
| @ New York
| 
| Giannis Antetokounmpo (22)
| Pat Connaughton (11)
| Jrue Holiday (9) 
| Madison Square Garden18,167
| 26–14
|-style="background:#cfc;"
| 41
| January 11
| @ Atlanta
| 
| Jrue Holiday (27)
| Giannis Antetokounmpo (18)
| Giannis Antetokounmpo (10)
| State Farm Arena17,154
| 27–14
|-style="background:#fcc;"
| 42
| January 12
| @ Miami
| 
| Jrue Holiday (24)
| Bobby Portis (7)
| Jrue Holiday (11)
| FTX Arena19,600
| 27–15
|-style="background:#fcc;"
| 43
| January 14
| @ Miami
| 
| Bobby Portis (15)
| Pat Connaughton (8)
| Jrue Holiday (10)
| Miami-Dade Arena19,620
| 27–16
|-style="background:#cfc;"
| 44
| January 16
| Indiana
| 
| Jrue Holiday (35)
| Bobby Portis (11)
| Jrue Holiday (11)
| Fiserv Forum17,412
| 28–16
|-style="background:#cfc;"
| 45
| January 17
| Toronto
| 
| Jrue Holiday (37)
| Bobby Portis (12)
| Joe Ingles (8)
| Fiserv Forum17,341
| 29–16
|-style="background:#fcc;"
| 46
| January 21
| @ Cleveland
| 
| Jrue Holiday (28)
| Bobby Portis (11)
| Jrue Holiday (10)
| Rocket Mortgage FieldHouse19,432
| 29–17
|-style="background:#cfc;"
| 47
| January 23
| @ Detroit
| 
| Giannis Antetokounmpo (29)
| Giannis Antetokounmpo (12)
| Jrue Holiday (7)
| Little Caesars Arena18,011
| 30–17
|-style="background:#cfc;"
| 48
| January 25
| Denver
| 
| Giannis Antetokounmpo (33)
| Giannis Antetokounmpo (14)
| Giannis Antetokounmpo (4)
| Fiserv Forum17,352
| 31–17
|-style="background:#cfc;"
| 49
| January 27
| @ Indiana
| 
| Giannis Antetokounmpo (41)
| Giannis Antetokounmpo (12)
| Jrue Holiday (9)
| Gainbridge Fieldhouse16,090
| 32–17
|-style="background:#cfc;"
| 50
| January 29
| New Orleans
| 
| Giannis Antetokounmpo (50)
| Giannis Antetokounmpo (13)
| Jrue Holiday (6)
| Fiserv Forum17,341
| 33–17
|-style="background:#cfc;"
| 51
| January 31
| Charlotte
| 
| Giannis Antetokounmpo (34)
| Giannis Antetokounmpo (18)
| Giannis Antetokounmpo (4)
| Fiserv Forum17,341
| 34–17

|-style="background:#cfc;"
| 52
| February 2
| L.A. Clippers
| 
| Giannis Antetokounmpo (54)
| Giannis Antetokounmpo (19)
| Jrue Holiday (8)
| Fiserv Forum17,341
| 35–17
|-style="background:#cfc;"
| 53
| February 4
| Miami
| 
| Giannis Antetokounmpo (35)
| Giannis Antetokounmpo (15)
| Giannis Antetokounmpo (11)
| Fiserv Forum18,008
| 36–17
|-style="background:#cfc;"
| 54
| February 6
| @ Portland
| 
| Brook Lopez (27)
| Giannis Antetokounmpo (13)
| G. Antetokounmpo, Holiday (8)
| Moda Center18,110
| 37–17
|-style="background:#cfc;"
| 55
| February 9
| @ L.A. Lakers
| 
| Giannis Antetokounmpo (38)
| G. Antetokounmpo, Lopez (10)
| Jrue Holiday (7)
| Crypto.com Arena18,997
| 38–17
|-style="background:#cfc;"
| 56
| February 10
| @ L.A. Clippers
| 
| Giannis Antetokounmpo (35)
| Brook Lopez (15)
| G. Antetokounmpo, Holiday, Ingles  (6)
| Crypto.com Arena16,614
| 39–17
|-style="background:#cfc;"
| 57
| February 14
| Boston
| 
| Jrue Holiday (40)
| Giannis Antetokounmpo (13)
| Giannis Antetokounmpo (9)
| Fiserv Forum17,623
| 40–17
|-style="background:#cfc;"
| 58
| February 16
| @ Chicago
| 
| Brook Lopez (33)
| G. Antetokounmpo, Ingles, Lopez (7)
| Jrue Holiday (9)
| United Center20,308
| 41–17
|-style="background:#bcf;"
| ASG
| February 19
| Team Giannis @ Team LeBron
| 
| Jayson Tatum (55)
| Jayson Tatum (10)
| Donovan Mitchell (10)
| Vivint Arena17,886
| 1–0
|-style="background:#cfc;"
| 59
| February 24
| Miami
| 
| Jrue Holiday (24)
| Bobby Portis (11)
| Jrue Holiday (7)
| Fiserv Forum17,676
| 42–17
|-style="background:#cfc;"
| 60
| February 26
| Phoenix
| 
| Jrue Holiday (33)
| Brook Lopez (13)
| Khris Middleton (6)
| Fiserv Forum17,636
| 43–17
|-style="background:#cfc;"
| 61
| February 28
| @ Brooklyn
| 
| Giannis Antetokounmpo (33)
| Giannis Antetokounmpo (15)
| Jrue Holiday (8)
| Barclays Center17,732
| 44–17

|-style="background:#cfc;"
| 62
| March 1
| Orlando
| 
| Giannis Antetokounmpo (31)
| Giannis Antetokounmpo (7)
| Jrue Holiday (9)
| Fiserv Forum17,354
| 45–17
|-style="background:#fcc;"
| 63
| March 4
| Philadelphia
| 
| Giannis Antetokounmpo (34)
| Giannis Antetokounmpo (13)
| Jrue Holiday (13)
| Fiserv Forum18,100
| 45–18
|-style="background:#cfc;"
| 64
| March 6
| @ Washington
| 
| Giannis Antetokounmpo (23)
| Giannis Antetokounmpo (9)
| Giannis Antetokounmpo (13)
| Capital One Arena18,746
| 46–18
|-style="background:#cfc;"
| 65
| March 7
| @ Orlando
| 
| Brook Lopez (26)
| Bobby Portis (11)
| Khris Middleton (11)
| Amway Center16,110
| 47–18
|-style="background:#cfc;"
| 66
| March 9
| Brooklyn
| 
| Bobby Portis (28)
| Bobby Portis (13)
| Holiday, Middleton (7)
| Fiserv Forum17,341
| 48–18
|-style="background:#fcc;"
| 67
| March 11
| @ Golden State
| 
| Lopez, Middleton (19)
| Bobby Portis (13)
| Jrue Holiday (8)
| Chase Center18,064
| 48–19
|-style="background:#cfc;"
| 68
| March 13
| @ Sacramento
| 
| Giannis Antetokounmpo (46)
| Giannis Antetokounmpo (12)
| Khris Middleton (9)
| Golden 1 Center18,111
| 49–19
|-style="background:#cfc;"
| 69
| March 14
| @ Phoenix
| 
| Giannis Antetokounmpo (36)
| Giannis Antetokounmpo (11)
| Giannis Antetokounmpo (8)
| Footprint Center17,071
| 50–19
|-style="background:#fcc;"
| 70
| March 16
| Indiana
| 
| Giannis Antetokounmpo (25)
| G. Antetokounmpo, Portis (9)
| Jrue Holiday (11)
| Fiserv Forum17,797
| 50–20
|-style="background:#cfc;"
| 71
| March 19
| Toronto
| 
| Brook Lopez (26)
| Giannis Antetokounmpo (13)
| Giannis Antetokounmpo (10)
| Fiserv Forum17,431
| 51–20
|-style="background:#fff;"
| 72
| March 22
| San Antonio
| 
| 
| 
| 
| Fiserv Forum0
| 0–0
|-style="background:#fff;"
| 73
| March 24
| @ Utah
| 
| 
| 
| 
| Vivint Arena0
| 0–0
|-style="background:#fff;"
| 74
| March 25
| @ Denver
| 
| 
| 
| 
| Ball Arena0
| 0–0
|-style="background:#fff;"
| 75
| March 27
| @ Detroit
| 
| 
| 
| 
| Little Caesars Arena0
| 0–0
|-style="background:#fff;"
| 76
| March 29
| @ Indiana
| 
| 
| 
| 
| Gainbridge Fieldhouse0
| 0–0
|-style="background:#fff;"
| 77
| March 30
| Boston
| 
| 
| 
| 
| Fiserv Forum0
| 0–0

|-style="background:#fff;"
| 78
| April 2
| Philadelphia
| 
| 
| 
| 
| Fiserv Forum0
| 0–0
|-style="background:#fff;"
| 79
| April 4
| @ Washington
| 
| 
| 
| 
| Capital One Arena0
| 0–0
|-style="background:#fff;"
| 80
| April 5
| Chicago
| 
| 
| 
| 
| Fiserv Forum0
| 0–0
|-style="background:#fff;"
| 81
| April 7
| Memphis
| 
| 
| 
| 
| Fiserv Forum0
| 0–0
|-style="background:#fff;"
| 82
| April 9
| @ Toronto
| 
| 
| 
| 
| Scotiabank Arena0
| 0–0

Transactions

Trades

Free agency

Re-signed

Additions

References 

Milwaukee Bucks seasons
Milwaukee Bucks
2022 in sports in Wisconsin
2023 in sports in Wisconsin